Watford Football Club is an English association football club, based in Watford, Hertfordshire. The club's history can be traced back to 1881; it took its current name in 1898, following the merger of West Hertfordshire and Watford St. Mary's. Since moving from a ground in Cassio Road in 1922, they have played their home matches at Vicarage Road stadium.

Many players have contributed significantly to the history of the club, despite playing a relatively small number of games. Paul Atkinson, Mo Johnston and Neil Price all featured for Watford in the 1984 FA Cup Final. Nick Wright scored the opening goal in Watford's 2–0 win over Bolton in the 1999 Football League First Division play-off Final, a game that Israel international Alon Hazan also participated in. Several players have gone on to become Premier League footballers following successful loan spells at Watford, including Chris Eagles and England international Adam Johnson; others such as Alexandre Bonnot and Steve Brooker played their only top division games in English football with Watford. In the 2009–10 season, on-loan Tom Cleverley became the first person ever to win the club's Player of the Season award having made fewer than 50 Watford appearances. Others made significant contributions to the club after their careers ended. Examples include Ron Gray, who managed the club after he retired as a player, and Price, who at various points commentated on the club's matches for the BBC, worked for the club, and formed the Watford Former Players' Association.

This list contains players who have made 49 or fewer competitive appearances for Watford. It includes appearances and goals in the Premier League, Football League, Southern Football League, FA Cup, Football League Cup, Football League Trophy, Full Members Cup, UEFA Cup and the Anglo-Italian Cup. Appearances and goals in other competitions or non-competitive matches are not included. The table does not include appearances and goals from 1939–1940, when the season was abandoned after three matches due to the Second World War. Two players—Billy Law and Tom Postlethwaite—made their only competitive appearances for the club in this season, and are therefore not listed. International appearances and goals given are for the senior national team only. Where a player represented his country, but not at full international level, details are given in the notes column.

Key

Current players' statistics correct as of 5 September 2014.

Players

Notes

References

General

Watford Football Club archive 1881-2017
Specific

Players 1-50
 1-50
Watford
Association football player non-biographical articles